Robert Alexander Lindsay, 29th Earl of Crawford and 12th Earl of Balcarres,  (5 March 1927 – 18 March 2023), styled Lord Balniel between 1940 and 1975, was a Scottish hereditary peer and Conservative politician who was a member of Parliament from 1955 to 1974. The elder son of the 28th Earl of Crawford and 11th Earl of Balcarres, he succeeded to the family titles in 1975. Lord Crawford and Balcarres was the Premier Earl of Scotland and chief of Clan Lindsay. Following the death of Lord Eden of Winton on 23 May 2020, Lindsay became the surviving former MP with the earliest date of first election, having first entered Parliament at the 1955 general election.

Early life
Lindsay was born on 5 March 1927, and educated at Eton College and Trinity College, Cambridge.  From 1945 to 1948, he served in the Grenadier Guards. He was honorary attaché at the British Embassy in Paris from 1950 to 1951 and then worked for the Conservative Research Department.

Career
Balniel was elected for the Conservative Party in Hertford at the 1955 general election, aged 28, and served as parliamentary private secretary to Henry Brooke until 1959. From 1959 to 1965, Balniel was president of the Rural District Councils Association, and from 1963 to 1970, he was chair of the National Association for Mental Health.

While the Conservative Party was in opposition, Balniel served as spokesman on Foreign Affairs from 1965 until 1967, and then joined the Shadow Cabinet as spokesman on Social Services. Following the party's victory in the 1970 general election, he served as minister of state for Defence, and then from 1972 was minister of state for Foreign and Commonwealth Affairs.

Balniel switched to represent Welwyn and Hatfield at the February 1974 general election, narrowly winning the seat, but he was defeated in the general election in October. He was given a life peerage as Baron Balniel, of Pitcorthie in the County of Fife, in January 1975 before succeeding as Earl of Crawford in December the same year. After the passage of House of Lords Act 1999, he sat in the Lords by virtue of his life peerage. He retired from the House of Lords on 28 November 2019.

Appointments
Crawford was appointed first Crown Estate commissioner from 1980 to 1985.

Crawford was Lord Chamberlain to Queen Elizabeth The Queen Mother between 1992 and her death in 2002.  He was appointed a Knight Grand Cross of the Royal Victorian Order (GCVO) in the 2002 Demise Honours, the special honours list published after the Queen Mother's death.

Marriage and children
Crawford married Ruth Beatrice Meyer-Bechtler (1924–2021) on 27 December 1949. They had four children:
 Lady Bettina Mary Lindsay (born 26 June 1950)
 Lady Iona Sina Lindsay (born 10 August 1957)
 Anthony Robert Lindsay, 30th Earl of Crawford (born 24 November 1958)
 Hon Alexander Walter Lindsay (born 18 March 1961)

Lord Crawford died at Balcarres House on 18 March 2023, at the age of 96. His titles passed to his eldest son, Anthony.

Honours
 Knight of the Thistle, 1996
 Knight Grand Cross of the Royal Victorian Order, 2002
 Privy Counsellor, 4 February 1972
 Deputy lieutenant of Fife, 23 July 1976

Ancestry

Arms

See also
 Balcarres House, Fife
 Peerage of Scotland
 Savoy Chapel

References

External links
 

1927 births
2023 deaths
29
Earls of Balcarres
Knights of the Thistle
People educated at Eton College
Alumni of Trinity College, Cambridge
Lindsay, Robert
Conservative Party (UK) life peers
Knights Grand Cross of the Royal Victorian Order
Members of the Privy Council of the United Kingdom
Grenadier Guards officers
Lindsay, Robert
Lindsay, Robert
Lindsay, Robert
Lindsay, Robert
Lindsay, Robert
Lindsay, Robert
Crawford, E29
UK MPs who were granted peerages
Deputy Lieutenants of Fife
Robert
British military personnel of the Palestine Emergency
Lindsay
Life peers created by Elizabeth II
Crawford